Ju Sang-song (born August 1933) is a North Korean politician and former Minister of People's Security.

Biography
Ju Sang-song was born in Kangwon-do Province in 1933, joined the Korean People's Army in June 1951, and later attended the Kim Il-sung Military University. During his career, he served as senior operations staff officer of an army corps, brigade commander, divisional commander, chief of staff of regional headquarters, commander of an army corps and inspector of the General Staff.

In 1970 he was elected alternate member of the Central Committee of the Workers' Party of Korea at the 5th Party Congress, and he was first elected deputy to the Supreme People's Assembly in 1990. He served as chairman of the SPA Legislation Committee. On December 24, 1991 he was promoted to full member of the WPK Central Committee, during the same meeting (the 19th Plenary Meeting of the 6th Central Committee) that appointed Kim Jong-il as the new Supreme Commander of the Korean People's Army.

The 1990s saw an increase of his importance: in 1992 he was promoted to colonel general and served in Kim Il-sung's funeral committee in 1994. In February 1997 he was appointed general, right on Kim Jong-il's 55th birthday, and received command of the IV Army Corps in South Hwanghae Province.

In late 2003, Ju was recalled to Pyongyang and replaced Choe Yong-su as Minister of Public Security in 2004. He was also elected a member of the National Defence Commission in 2009, as part of a plan to expand the Commission membership.

In the spring of 2010, the Ministry of Public Security was put directly under the National Defence Commission and renamed Ministry of People's Security, with full responsibility over the Korean People's Internal Security Force. Ju Sang-song was confirmed its minister, although he was now under NDC Vice-Chairman Chang Sung-taek. His status was furtherly enhanced at the September 2010 Conference of the Workers' Party of Korea, as he was re-elected Central Committee member and promoted to Politburo member.

Ju Sang-song's last public appearance was during a performance of the Korean People's Internal Security Forces Song and Dance Ensemble honouring Kim Jong-il's 69th birthday in February, 2011. He was officially dismissed on March 16 by decision of the NDC, with the Korean Central News Agency reporting: "Ju Sang Song, minister of People’s Security of the National Defence Commission of the DPRK, was dismissed from his post due to illness".

References

North Korean military personnel
1933 births
Living people
People from Kangwon Province (North Korea)
Members of the Supreme People's Assembly
Government ministers of North Korea
Members of the 6th Politburo of the Workers' Party of Korea
Alternate members of the 5th Central Committee of the Workers' Party of Korea
Alternate members of the 6th Central Committee of the Workers' Party of Korea
Members of the 6th Central Committee of the Workers' Party of Korea